Shaver's Creek Environmental Center is located between State College and Huntingdon, Pennsylvania, in the Stone Valley Recreation Area. This is part of the Penn State Experimental Forest. Each year more than 100,000 people visit the center, which is open daily from February 1 to December 15 (excluding Thanksgiving). The Environmental Center contains an amphitheater; classrooms; Welcome Center and Pennsylvania Nature Book and Gift Shop; herb and flower gardens; picnic areas; raptor center; and other displays and exhibits. The center describes its mission as follows: "Shaver's Creek Environmental Center is committed to extending the University's Outreach mission of instruction, service, and research. Through quality programs, we teach, model, and provide the knowledge, values, skills, experiences, and dedication that enable individuals and communities to achieve and maintain harmony between human activities and the natural systems that support all living species."

Programs

Outdoor School
Shaver's Creek Outdoor School is a 50-year-old program that aims to provide upper elementary school-aged children with a positive outdoor experience. Outdoor School is a four-day, three-night residential program in which Penn State students give hands-on lessons in topics of outdoor education. Students come from Centre, Huntingdon, Mifflin, and other central Pennsylvania areas. They have the unique opportunity to live in cabins on the property of Camp Blue Diamond in Petersburg, Pennsylvania, and are given first-hand experience with wildlife, night hikes, campfires, family-style meals, and living things lessons.

The Raptor Center
The Shaver's Creek Raptor center houses over 20 birds of prey, all of which have sustained permanent injuries which make them unfit for release back into the wild. The only exception is the American kestrel, who was an illegally raised pet prior to finding a place with Shaver's.
 
The Raptor Center at Shaver's Creek is open to the public daily from 10:00 am – 5:00 pm during the months of March through December. Visitors are offered packets on the natural history and biography of each raptor to enable self-guided tours. Also available is a Birds of Prey Show that runs each Saturday and Sunday from 2:00 – 4:00 pm during April through November.

Featured birds of prey include a golden eagle, two great horned owls, three barred owls, one grey-phase and two red-phase eastern screech owls, two red-shouldered hawks, a broad-winged hawk, two red-tailed hawks, a turkey vulture, a juvenile bald eagle, two adult bald eagles, and two barn owls.

Children's Halloween Trail
Throughout the weekend prior to Halloween, Shaver's Creek Environmental Center puts on a free Fall Festival that includes face painting, pumpkin carving, arts and crafts, music and live entertainment, natural history programs, food and drink, and the Children's Halloween Trail. Staffed by Penn State students participating in the Recreation, Parks, Tourism, and Management major, the Trail is a guided walk through the decorated Shaver's Creek forest, complete with costumed characters.  The event aims to teach the natural history associated with Halloween - for example, explaining why certain animals and creatures (such as owls, spiders, corn stalks, and pumpkins) are Halloween mascots.

The Birding Cup
The Birding cup is a fundraising tournament held once a year at Shaver's Creek Environmental Center. The contest calls for teams of at least three  birders to identify as many species of birds as they can within a 24-hour period. Contestants are required to remain within the parameters of Huntingdon, Centre, and adjoining counties of Central Pennsylvania.

Following the contest, awards are given at Millbrook Marsh Nature Center in State College, Pennsylvania, in several categories: The Birding Cup (the team which identifies the most species overall); The County Cup (the team that identifies the most species while only searching one county); The Potter Mug (the best team on which at least half of the members have only two years of birding experience); and The Birding Boot (the best team that travels only by non-motorized means, such as biking, hiking, or canoeing).

Maple Harvest Festival
The Maple Harvest Festival has been a staple at Shaver's Creek Environmental Center since 1984. The event celebrates the first maple harvest of the year and teaches the maple sugaring processes of the past and present. Participants learn to identify and tap sugar maple trees, enjoy the process of sap being turned into syrup, and watch interpreters act out methods of past harvesters ranging from Native Americans to modern-day farmers. Following the performance, there is live music, storytelling, and all-you-can-eat pancakes and maple syrup.

References

External links 

 

Pennsylvania State University
Nature centers in Pennsylvania
Parks in Huntingdon County, Pennsylvania
Education in Huntingdon County, Pennsylvania
Protected areas of Huntingdon County, Pennsylvania